William Griggs Stahlnecker (June 20, 1849 – March 26, 1902) was an American lawyer and politician who served four terms as a U.S. Representative from New York from 1885 to 1893.

Biography
Born in Auburn, New York, Stahlnecker moved with his parents to Brooklyn and later to New York City.
He pursued an academic course and attended New York University in New York City.
He studied law.
He was admitted to practice.
He engaged in mercantile pursuits.
He served as member of the New York Produce Exchange.
He moved to Yonkers in 1880.

Political career 
He served as mayor of Yonkers, New York from 1884 to 1886.
He served as delegate to the Democratic State convention at Saratoga in June 1884.
He served as delegate to the Democratic National Convention in 1884.

Congress 
Stahlnecker was elected as a Democrat to the Forty-ninth and to the three succeeding Congresses (March 4, 1885 – March 3, 1893).

Later career and death 
He engaged in the practice of law.

He died in Yonkers, New York, March 26, 1902.
He was interred in Sleepy Hollow Cemetery, Tarrytown, New York.

Sources

1849 births
1902 deaths
American people of Dutch descent
Burials at Sleepy Hollow Cemetery
Mayors of Yonkers, New York
Democratic Party members of the United States House of Representatives from New York (state)
19th-century American politicians
Politicians from Auburn, New York
New York University alumni